The Clark County Department of Aviation is a part of the government of the Clark County Commission. Harry Reid International Airport, the main commercial airport and the four general aviation facilities in the Clark County Airport System are owned by the Clark County Commission and operated under the policy direction of the Board of County Commissioners, the authority of the County Manager and the management of the Director and Deputy Director of Aviation.

Airports

Henderson Executive Airport
Henderson Executive Airport  is located in Henderson. The airport functions mainly as a general purpose airport.

Jean Sport Aviation Center
Jean Sport Aviation Center  is located in Jean. The airport functions as a sport aviation center including sky diving and gliding.

North Las Vegas Airport
North Las Vegas Airport  is located in North Las Vegas. The airport functions mainly as a general purpose airport.

Perkins Field
Perkins Field  is located in Overton. The airport functions mainly as a general purpose airport.

Harry Reid International Airport
Harry Reid International Airport  is located in Paradise – The primary commercial airport for Las Vegas and Clark County

Heliports

Planned airfields
 Ivanpah Valley Airport, Jean - planned future relief airport for Reid
 Sloan heliport

Sources
 Sloan heliport

External links
 Department of Aviation uses McCarran website

Airport operators of the United States
Government of Clark County, Nevada